The Far Shore is a Canadian drama film, directed by Joyce Wieland and released in 1976. Wieland's first commercial narrative feature film after years of making experimental short films, the film is a romantic drama which borrows elements from the life and death of painter Tom Thomson.

It premiered at the 1976 Cannes Film Festival, before having its Canadian premiere at the Canadian Film Institute's Ottawa 76 festival in August.

Plot
Eulalie (Celine Lomez), a Québécois woman in a loveless marriage to wealthy industrialist Ross Turner (Lawrence Benedict), begins an affair with painter Tom McLeod (Frank Moore).

Production
Wieland wrote the initial outline of the film in 1969, after viewing a retrospective show of Thomson and the Group of Seven. The film was originally titled True Patriot Love.  After failing to receive a grant from the Canadian Film Development Corporation, she shelved the project for a time, although some of the drawings that she made to accompany the script outline were included in her gallery shows. She began writing the screenplay in earnest in 1972, hiring television writer Bryan Barney to assist. During this time, she also drew a large number of storyboards to illustrate her vision for the film. Shooting for the film occurred from 18 November to 6 December 1974, and from 7 June to 25 June 1975, on a budget of $435,000, with $200,000 coming from the CFDC.

Judy Steed came on as producer in 1973, with Wieland and Steed incorporating their own production company, The Far Shore Inc., in 1974. Over the next couple of years, they were able to secure partial funding from CFDC, Famous Players, Baton Broadcasting and the Toronto Star, but were not able to complete the film until influential Quebec film producer Pierre Lamy signed on as the film's executive producer in 1975, securing the remaining funding needed. Famous Players' financial commitment was initially made conditional on the film hiring a big-name star to play Tom McLeod, suggesting Rip Torn, Stacy Keach and Donald Sutherland, but they eventually withdrew the demand and allowed the film to proceed with Moore in the role. Filming was completed in 1975, with post-production completed in early 1976.

Release
The film was shown at the National Arts Centre on 5 August 1976, and theatrically released on 24 September.

Critical response
Gary Michael Dault of the Toronto Star called the film gorgeous, praising the cinematography of Richard Leiterman and the production design of Anne Pritchard, but said it was ruined by the acting. The reviewer for The Globe and Mail offered a similar assessment, calling the film beautiful but flat and stating that Moore gave the film's only strong acting performance.

The film is one of several from the era which have since been analyzed as an allegory for Canadian nationalism.

Awards
The film won three Canadian Film Awards in 1976: Best Supporting Actor (Moore), Best Cinematography (Leiterman) and Best Art Direction (Pritchard).

References

Works cited

External links
 

1976 films
1976 drama films
Canadian drama films
English-language Canadian films
1970s English-language films
1970s Canadian films
Films directed by Joyce Wieland